Arthrosaura is a genus of spectacled lizards in the family Gymnophthalmidae.

Geographic range
Lizards in the genus Arthrosaura are endemic to northern South America.

Taxonomy
Within the genus Arthrosaura there appears to be two species groups: a longer-legged, short-bodied group with four supraocular scales (A. kockii, and A. testigensis); and a short-legged, gracile group with three supraoculars (A. reticulata, A. synaptolepis, A. tyleri, and A. versteegii ).

Species
There are seven species which are recognized as being valid:
Arthrosaura kockii 
Arthrosaura montigena 
Arthrosaura reticulata  - yellowbelly arthrosaura
Arthrosaura synaptolepis 
Arthrosaura testigensis 
Arthrosaura tyleri 
Arthrosaura versteegii

References

Further reading
Boulenger GA (1885). Catalogue of the Lizards in the British Museum (Natural History). Second Edition. Volume II. ... Teiidæ ... London: Trustees of the British Museum (Natural History). (Taylor and Francis, printers). xiii + 497 pp. + Plates I-XXIV. (Arthrosaura, new genus, p. 389).

 
Lizards of South America
Lizard genera
Taxa named by George Albert Boulenger